Neuromonakh Feofan is a musical project from St. Petersburg, Russia, combining drum 'n' bass and Russian folk music.

Neuromonakh Feofan's performances are styled after traditional Russian festivals. The group members perform in bast shoes, kosovorotkas and sarafans. One member performs dressed as a bear. The group's lyrics incorporate Church Slavonic and obsolete Russian words, and they play balalaika over the drum 'n' bass beats.

Members 
The project's main members are songwriter and performer Neuromonakh Feofan, DJ Nikodim, and the Bear. The group members remain anonymous, and Neuromonakh Feofan appears on stage with his face covered by an Eastern Orthodox-style hood. 

In a 2018 interview, Neuromonakh Feofan revealed that his real name is Oleg Stepanov.

History 
In an interview with Afisha magazine, Nikodim stated that he professionally studied music before meeting Feofan. Neuromonakh Feofan had started recording songs in 2009. Feofan and Nikodim came up with the idea to start a new musical project during their forest walks.

The group's debut album, Drum in the Soul, Bright Rus' in the Heart, was released in early 2015. The group toured cities in Russia and Belarus to promote the album. The album was warmly received by listeners and critics and entered the top 10 of Russian iTunes.

Neuromonakh Feofan has performed at Russian music festivals such as Kubana, Nashestvie, Dikaya Myata, and VK Fest.

Neuromonakh Feofan was listed as the Russian Independent Performer of the Year on the Yandex Music's 2015 year-end list, based on the streaming service's listening statistics.

Critical reception 
Musical critics have noted the novelty of the fusion of Russian folk motifs with electronic dance music in Neuromonakh's music, comparing the project with some legendary Russian performers like MC Vspyshkin and Ivan Kupala.

In an interview, Sergey Shnurov said that Neuromonakh Feofan is “a combination of the incompatible, they are Orthodox atheists, they are believing communists”. Shnurov also approved Neuromonakh Feofan's activities in social networks.

The lyrics of Neuromonakh's songs abound with references to the life of Ancient Rus and are devoted to Russian nature and physical labor, but they contain a bit of irony. The main distinguishing feature of the project is their image and visual component. In her article at Zvuki.ru, Victoria Bazoeva pointed to a good level of stylization, and noted that the use of modern words along with historicism can somewhat disappoint some true connoisseurs of reliable historical reconstruction. After the first album release many people were unconcerned about Feofan, but the touring success and the performance at "Cubana" Festival forced many critics to reconsider their opinion.

The creativity of the project is sometimes called conceptual, postmodernist, while contrasting, however, with representatives of contemporary Russian art like Vladimir Sorokin.

According to The Calvert Journal, Neuromonakh Feofan were part of a 2010s trend in Russian music of combining western electronic sounds with Russian Orthodox and folk musical traditions.

Discography

Studio albums 
 2015 — Drum in the Soul, Bright Rus' in the Heart
 2016 — Great Forces of Goodness
 2017 — To Dance. To Sing
 2022 – Old Russian Rave 

EPs 

 2018 — 
 2018 — )
 2018 — 
 2018 — 
 2019 —

Singles 

 2015 — "To Trample Down"
 2015 — "Now I Want to Dance!"
 2016 — "The Hut is Walking with Staggering"
 2016 — "Old Russian Drum"
 2017 — "And Now the Bear is Singing"
 2017 — "Old Russian Soul" (feat. Slot)
 2018 — "Viski" (feat. Bi-2)

Videos

References

External links 
 Neuromonakh Feofan discography on Discogs
 Interview with Neuromonk Feofan (Russian)
 vDud pres. Neuromonk Feofan (Russian)

Russian electronic musicians
Alternative dance musical groups
Russian techno musicians
Musical groups from Saint Petersburg
Musical groups established in 2009
Masked musicians